Ariana Marie (born March 15, 1993) is an American pornographic actress, cam-girl, and dancer. Marie was Miss November 2014 in Penthouse Pet of the Month, and has been nominated for numerous AVN Awards, XBIZ Awards, and other industry awards. As of June 2019 Ariana is under a one-year Exclusive Contract as an actress and spokesmodel for Vixen.

Biography

Marie was born in Dallas, Texas into a family with Irish, German, Belgian and Puerto Rican origins. She has three older brothers. When she was little, her family moved to Clearwater, Florida, for her father's job, where she grew up and graduated. After briefly working as a waitress, she made her debut in the porn industry in September 2013, at age 20. Her first scene was for PornPros with Giselle Mari and Danny Mountain. Marie was initially paid $1,200 per scene, a rate at "the higher end of today's standard range", but her booking agent took a 40-percent commission; Marie was initially unaware that this was far higher than the usual 10-20-percent commission. Marie's next agent took a lower rate, but also pushed her to work for less pay for companies with whom he was friendly. Marie initially "focused on filming for the traditional porn companies", working for studios including Mile High, Bang Productions, Adam & Eve, Girlfriends Films, Kick Ass Pictures, Evil Angel, Pure Play Media, and Pulse Distribution. She has also worked for sites like Mofos, Bang Bros, HD Passion, Digital Desire, Naughty America, and Vixen.

In November 2014, she was named Pet of the Month by Penthouse magazine. The same month, she was chosen as Twistys Treat of the Month. In 2015, she was nominated for several Best New Starlet awards in the industry, including the AVN Awards and XBIZ Awards in that category, and for the AVN Awards in the Best Three-Way Sex Scene Girl / Girl / Boy category for Keisha, alongside Keisha Grey and Manuel Ferrara.

After several years of success in the pornographic film industry, Marie branched out into webcam modelling. A 2017 Maxim article on cam-girls profiled Marie, noting that her house is "outfitted with cameras that give her audience a live stream from nearly every room, including the shower", and quoting Marie as saying that there were "a total of eight, maybe ten cameras throughout the whole house", having "a feed that goes 24/7 for the fans to see a day in the life of Ariana Marie." In a 2017 Glamour magazine interview, Marie stated that she "always did well in school, but it didn't hold my attention. So although I'm sure I could have made it through college, I don't know if I would have had the patience for it". She also discussed how her adult film career improved her financial status:

In 2015, Marie expressed disagreement with proposed laws that would require pornographic actors to use condoms, noting that they are a distraction when filming, and expressing her trust in the process performers go through to be tested for sexually transmitted diseases. Marie stated in a 2018 Cosmopolitan article that her preferred condom is Lifestyles SKYN, which Marie claims cause less irritation than other condoms. According to Marie, "I've given blowjobs with guys wearing it and I don't even smell or taste anything. That makes me happy, because normally I'd gag, but not with these ones". In August 2018, The Daily Dot named her one of the 30 top porn stars in virtual reality.

, Marie has shot over 160 films. Between Twitter, Instagram, and other social media sites, Marie reportedly has "over a million combined social media followers". She has two tattoos on her body, including a 15 above right breast and left hip. By 2019, Marie had found that promoting her own brand with self-made content was more lucrative than working for other production companies, although she has since continued doing work for those production companies on a limited basis for the purpose of "maintaining status and recognition within the industry".

Personal life
Marie is married to retired adult performer Jack Spade. In June 2022, she revealed on Twitter that she was pregnant, and in November, she tweeted that she had given birth to her first child, a girl.

Awards

References

External links

1993 births
American pornographic film actresses
Living people
Pornographic film actors from Texas
Webcam models
Penthouse Pets
21st-century American women